Temora was an electoral district for the Legislative Assembly in the Australian State of New South Wales from 1927 to 1981, including the town of Temora.

Members for Temora

History
Temora was created in 1927 with the abandonment of proportional representation, replacing part of the 3 member district of Cootamundra and its first member, Hugh Main, had been one of the members for Cootamundra. The district was abolished in the 1980 redistribution and was divided between Burrinjuck, Lachlan and Murrumbidgee.

Election results

References

Former electoral districts of New South Wales
Constituencies established in 1927
1927 establishments in Australia
Constituencies disestablished in 1981
1981 disestablishments in Australia